Can't Blame the Youth is a compilation album of Peter Tosh's work while with The Wailers.  It was released in 2004.

Track listing
All tracks composed and arranged by Peter Tosh except where noted.

Personnel
Digital Restoration, Mastering - David Blackman
Concept, Sleeve Notes, Track Titles - Jeremy Collingwood
Producer - Joe Gibbs
Photography - Ossie Hamilton
Composer - George Harrison, Bobby Russell, Peter Tosh, Traditional
Producer - Leslie Kong; Prince Tony, Peter Tosh
Executive Producer - David Simmons, Danny Sims
Primary Artist - Peter Tosh

See also
List of anti-war songs

References

2004 compilation albums
Peter Tosh albums